The Cotter Formation is a geologic formation in Arkansas, Missouri, Oklahoma and in Virginia. It preserves fossils dating back to the Ordovician period.

See also

 List of fossiliferous stratigraphic units in Arkansas
 List of fossiliferous stratigraphic units in Virginia
 Paleontology in Arkansas
 Paleontology in Virginia

References

 

Ordovician United States
Dolomite formations
Ordovician Arkansas
Ordovician Missouri
Ordovician geology of Virginia
Ordovician geology of New York (state)
Ordovician geology of Oklahoma
Ordovician geology of Tennessee
Ordovician System of North America
Ordovician southern paleotropical deposits